Mohammed Khammar Kanouni or Guenouni (1938 in Ksar el-Kebir-1991) was one of the three most important poets of Morocco in the 1960s. Together with Ahmed Mejjati and Mohamed Serghini he represented a generation of change.  His poetry represents the transition between writers before and after Moroccan independence. He is considered one of the fathers of the poets who broke through in the eighties.

His poems were first published in the French anthology of Moroccan poetry La Memoire future (Maspero, 1976, ed. by Tahar Ben Jelloun). His poems were regularly published in the cultural supplement of the daily newspaper Al-'Alam.

Kanouni grew up in Larache, received his PhD from the university in Rabat in 1974 and worked for Moroccan national radio and as a teacher at secondary schools and university.

Some of his poems were translated  by Abdellatif Laabi and published in La poesía marroquí: de la independencia a nuestros días, Santa Cruz de Tenerife:Idea, 2006.

Notes

Bibliography
 Ramâd Hisbirîs. Casablanca: Toubkal, 1987. (Las cenizas de las Hespérides) Poems
Al-shâ`ir lam yamut, Tanger: Wikâla Shirâ` li-H:idmât, 1998.  (The poet does not die) Poetry

External links
Literaturea marroqui 

20th-century Moroccan poets
1938 births
1991 deaths
People from Ksar el-Kebir
20th-century poets